Shovavim is a period of six to eight weeks each year, in which some Kabbalists teach one should focus on repenting for one's sins, particularly sexual sins.

The name shovavim is a Hebrew acronym for the Jewish parshioth (Torah portions) of "Shemot", "Va'era", "Bo", "B'Shallach", "Yitro" and "Mishpatim". The period in which these portions are read typically falls around Tevet-Shevat in the Hebrew calendar (corresponding to January–February). During a Jewish leap-year, this period is extended to an eight-week sequence called "Shovavim Tat", derived by adding the next two portions, "Terumah" and "Tetzaveh", to the list.

The acronym shovavim also forms a Hebrew word, meaning "mischief-makers." This word appears in Jeremiah 3:22, which begins: "Return oh mischief makers". Thus the name shovavim is symbolic of the repentance which one is exhorted to do in this period.

History
There are several early sources for the fasting eight times in a leap year; the observance in a non-leap year is much later. The earliest source for Shovevim brought by Rabbi Joseph Yuzpa Ostreicher in Leket Yosher, where he says that his teacher, Rabbi Israel Isserlein would fast on the Thursday of these weeks in a leap year. The custom of fasting in a leap year is also mentioned in Sefer Haminhagim of Isaac Tyrnau.

In the times of the Kabbalists, these practices took on a new meaning.  Firstly, it was expanded to include every year (albeit only six weeks) rather than only in a leap year. In this season, the kabbalists teach that it is auspicious to repent for sins ("mischief"), especially for sexually-related transgressions.

During these weeks, it is customary to be more careful not to violate any of the sexually-related transgressions commanded in the Torah. Some have the customs of studying laws relating to such transgressions, fasting and giving extra tzedakah (charity) during this time, and of reciting Selichot and other tikkunim (Kabbalistic prayers or meditations) designed to counteract their harmful effects. On the Shabbatot (Saturdays, the Jewish Sabbath) when these weekly portions of the Torah are read, some take upon themselves to refrain from speaking, except words of prayer and Torah. This type of fast is called a ta'anit dibbur.

Since these customs were popularized by Jewish Kabbalistic teachings, Sephardic and Hassidic Jews are more likely to follow them than their Ashkenazic counterparts.  Nevertheless, certain very traditional Eastern Ashkenazic communities, such as Golders Green Beth Hamedrash and Wien (in the Wien communities that preserve Nusach Ashkenaz) follow the original custom to recite the Selichot for these days in a leap-year only, and there may be individuals in these communities who fast as well.

Practices

Fasting
During the Shovavim period, some Jews have the custom to fast every Thursday - some do Monday and Thursday - from dawn until dusk. One custom is to fast only the first Monday and Thursday and the second Monday ("beit hey beit", or "BaHaB"). Some fast on Friday (the eve of Shabbat) until the afternoon.

Prayer
There are extra prayers added called "Tikkun Shovavim" during these weeks. Some have the custom of praying more prayers and reading extra Psalms during this period.

Ta'anit Dibbur
A special type of fast called a ta'anit dibbur is observed by some during the Shovavim period. This does not involve refraining from eating and drinking, but from speaking. During the entire day (usually Shabbat, when regular fasting is prohibited), between sunrise and dusk, one refrains from superfluous speech. Speaking words of prayer and Torah is permitted. Some Jewish congregations gather on the Shabbat when these speech fasts are held, to read the entire book of Psalms three times (a total of 450 psalms). At an average pace, this reading can take up to ten hours. This is usually accomplished between the Shabbat morning meal and the afternoon prayer.

References

External links
 Yeshshem: Shovvavim Period

Acronyms
Hebrew calendar
Hebrew names of Jewish holy days
Jewish fast days